Gunnar Nelson may refer to:
Gunnar Nelson (musician), American musician, singer, and songwriter
Gunnar Nelson (fighter), Icelandic mixed martial artist

See also
Gunnar Nielsen (disambiguation)
Gunnar Nilsson (disambiguation)